A list of American films released in 1973.
The Sting won the Academy Award for Best Picture. The highest-grossing film of the year was The Exorcist.

Highest-grossing
 The Exorcist
 The Sting
 American Graffiti
 Papillon
 The Way We Were
 Magnum Force
 Robin Hood
 Walking Tall
 Serpico
 Jesus Christ Superstar
 The World's Greatest Athlete
 Enter the Dragon

A–B

C–G

H–M

N–S

T–Z

Documentaries

See also
 1973 in the United States

References

External links

 1973 films at the Internet Movie Database
 List of 1973 box office number-one films in the United States

1973
Films
Lists of 1973 films by country or language